Aplio was an Internet appliance maker located in San Bruno, California. They were a French startup that was founded in 1996. They were acquired by Net2Phone in 2000.

Their product Aplio/Phone is a device that allowed a standard telephone to communicate across the Internet. It was named Product of the Year by the Internet Telephony magazine. Version 2.0 was shipped in 1999. Aplio/Pro was an Internet telephony appliance with an embedded Linux kernel. It was named Product of the Year by Internet Telephony and Communications Services magazines.

References

Companies established in 1996